The NCAA Division II Women's Soccer Championship is an American intercollegiate college soccer tournament conducted by the National Collegiate Athletic Association (NCAA) to determine the Division II women's national champion.

The Division II Championship has been held annually since 1988. It was the third of the NCAA-sponsored women's soccer tournaments to be established; the NCAA Division I Women's Soccer Championship began in 1981 and the NCAA Division III Women's Soccer Championship in 1986. 

Western Washington are the current champions. The Vikings won their second national title in 2022, defeating West Chester in the final, 2–1.

Grand Valley State is the most successful program, with seven national titles.

Champions

Cumulative results

 Schools highlight in yellow have reclassified athletics from NCAA Division II.
 Schools highlight in pink have closed or discontinued athletics.

See also
AIAW Intercollegiate Women's Soccer Champions
NCAA Women's Soccer Championships (Division I, Division III)
NCAA Men's Soccer Championships (Division I, Division II, Division III)
 NAIA Women's Soccer Championship
 Intercollegiate Soccer Football Association

References

External links
NCAA Division II women's soccer page

 
NCAA Division II women's soccer

Soccer, women's